The Territorial Cup Series (also known as the Duel in the Desert Series) is the yearlong rivalry competition between the University of Arizona Wildcats (U of A) and the Arizona State University Sun Devils (ASU). The series first started in 2009 and State Farm was the original sponsor until 2012 (both universities are currently seeking new sponsorship). Although without an official sponsor, media outlets and both universities continue to track and promote the series records.

The name comes from the Territorial Cup, the trophy that is awarded to the winner of the annual football game between the two schools.

History
At the beginning of the 2009–10 school year, both U of A and ASU decided to start a rivalry series, since they wanted to expand the rivalry in all sports. Each academic year points will be awarded to the winning team or school at the conclusion of 18 rivalry sports competitions or series. The university with the most post would earn state bragging rights, as well as being awarded a new series trophy which would be kept by the winning University until the completion of the following season.

From the start of the 2009 until the end of the 2012 season the teams competed in 18 events that both Universities competed at the Division 1 Level.  Following the 2013 season both schools would agree to add multiple Men's & Women's events bringing the total to 20.  The total would increase to the current 21, with ASU adding Men's Tennis in 2018.

Men's Events
 Baseball
 Basketball
 Cross Country
 Football
 Golf
 Indoor Track and Field
 Outdoor Track and Field
 Swimming and Diving
 Tennis

Women's Events
 Basketball
 Beach Volleyball
 Cross Country
 Golf
 Gymnastics
 Indoor Track and Field
 Outdoor Track and Field
 Soccer
 Softball
 Swimming and Diving
 Tennis
 Volleyball

The first season, 2009–10 ended with Arizona winning in a 10.5–7.5 victory.  In the second season, 2010–11 U of A would win its second in a row with an 11.5–6.5 victory.  The third season & final season sponsored by State Farm, 2011–12 U of A would win the 3rd straight & by the largest margin in series history by a final of 12.5–5.5.  In the 2012–13, Arizona would win its fourth consecutive Series title by a score of 9.5–8.5. 

ASU would win their first-ever title during the 2013–14 season with an 11.5–8.5 victory.  During the 2014–15 season, ASU would win their second series in a row with a final score of 12.5–7.5.  ASU would go on to with their third straight title during the 2015–16 season again by the final tally of 12.5–7.5.  With ASU earning points in: Men's Football, Cross Country, Golf, Baseball, Indoor Track & Field and Outdoor Track & Field.  Women's Soccer, Volleyball(½), Cross Country, Basketball, Golf, Tennis and Indoor Track & Field  In 2016–17, ASU would win the series for a record straight 4th year in a row by a margin of 10.5–9.5.  With ASU earning points in: Men's Cross Country, Indoor Track & Field, Swimming & Diving, Golf and Outdoor Track & Field.  Women's Volleyball(½), Basketball(½), Indoor Track & Field, Gymnastics, Beach Volleyball(½), Tennis and Outdoor Track & Field.

The following 2017–18 season, U of A would go on to claim its first victory since 2012 & 4th overall by a final score of 11–10.  U of A would earn points in: Men's Cross Country, Basketball, Indoor Track & Field, Outdoor Track & Field & Baseball.  Women's Volleyball, Cross Country, Soccer, Beach Volleyball, Softball & Golf.

ASU would reclaim the series in 2018–19 & fifth overall with the series ending in a 10.5–10.5 tie but ASU finished higher in the Directors' Cup 22nd to 39th.  ASU would earn points in: Football, Basketball, Baseball, Golf, Tennis.  Women's Cross Country, Basketball(½), Swimming & Diving, Gymnastics, Tennis, and Outdoor Track & Field.

The 2019–20 season would end in bizarre fashion due to the COVID-19 pandemic, which cut all collegiate athletics short in March 2021 but U of A would again recapture the series, its 5th overall by leading the series 7.5–4.5.  U of A earned points in: Men's Cross Country, Basketball(½), Swimming & Diving and Indoor Track & Field.  Women's Cross Country, Soccer, Basketball, Indoor Track & Field.  U of A would win their second series in a row & 6th overall during the 2020–21 season by a score of 10–9.  U of A would earn points in: Men's Basketball, Cross Country, Baseball, Tennis & Golf.  Women's Basketball(½), Indoor Track and Field, Cross Country, Beach Volleyball, Volleyball(½) & Soccer.

Arizona State would regain the series in the 2021–22 season its 6th overall by a final score of 12.5–8.5.  ASU would earn points in: Men's & Women's Cross Country, Football, Women's Basketball(½), Women's Gymnastics, Men's Swimming & Diving, Women's Beach Volleyball(½), Men's Indoor Track and Field, Women's Indoor Track and Field, Softball, Women's Tennis, Baseball(½), Men's Golf & Men's Outdoor Track and Field.

Point system

Points are awarded for all sports in which both schools maintain an intercollegiate team during the school year. Each sport is worth one point, which is awarded to the winner of the head-to-head match-up between the two teams. If the head-to-head match-up ends in a tie, each team receives half a point. In baseball and softball, all games, both conference and non-conference, count as one point combined. In swimming and diving, cross country, golf, and track and field, whichever team finishes higher in the standings at the Pac-12 championship receives one point. In addition, games between the schools in Pac-12 tournament and NCAA tournament play will count towards the series as well. Should the two universities finish tied, the winner shall be decided by whichever school finishes higher in the Directors' Cup standings.  If the teams finish in a tie in the Director Cup standings, the winner of the Duel in the Desert will decide the tie.

Trophy
The winner of the series receives a silver Territorial Cup Series trophy. One university must accumulate at least 11 points or more to win the trophy outright. When the trophy is won, the logo of the winner is featured at the top of it. If U of A wins, a block “A” logo is placed on top of the trophy. If ASU wins the trophy, a “Sparky the Sun Devil” logo (not the current ASU “pitchfork” logo) will be placed. If both schools finish tied at 10½ points, the series ends in a tie and the school that finishes higher in Director's Cup Standings retains the trophy.  The 2019–20 was cut short in the wake of the COVID-19 outbreak, which resulted in the schools only playing in 12 of the 21 events.

Yearly results
Arizona Leads the All-time series 7–6

 † ASU clinched victory due to higher finish in Directors' Cup standings.
 ‡ 2019–20 season was cut short due to the COVID-19 outbreak. Arizona was declared winner with the most points.
 ₳ 2020–21 season ASU Men's & Women's Swimming & Diving both opted out of the season, resulting in 2 fewer points.

Points by Sport

Current Standings

2022—23 Schedule

Previous Standings

2021—22 Schedule

2020—21 Schedule

 2020–21 season ASU Men's & Women's Swimming & Diving both opted out of the season, resulting in 2 fewer points & did not count towards final standings.
2020–21 because of Covid travel restrictions, U of A & ASU Women's Gymnastics competed twice, each meet for ½ point.

2019—20 Schedule

All events, Men's & Women's beginning March 12, 2020 would be canceled due to the Covid-19 Pandemic.  Arizona was leading 7½−4½ resulting in a victory

2018—19 Schedule

ASU finished 19th while Arizona finished 41st in the Director Cup Standings, resulting in ASU winning the tie-break.

2017—18 Schedule

2016—17 Schedule

2015—16 Schedule

2014—15 Schedule

2013—14 Schedule

2012—13 Schedule

2011—12 Schedule

2010—11 Schedule

2009—10 Schedule

References

External links
 University of Arizona Athletics
 Arizona State University Athletics

College sports rivalries in the United States
Arizona culture
Arizona Wildcats
Arizona State Sun Devils
College sports in Arizona